Miroslav Janota (born 19 March 1948) is a Czech former wrestler. He competed at the 1972 Summer Olympics, the 1976 Summer Olympics and the 1980 Summer Olympics.

References

External links
 

1948 births
Living people
Czech male sport wrestlers
Olympic wrestlers of Czechoslovakia
Wrestlers at the 1972 Summer Olympics
Wrestlers at the 1976 Summer Olympics
Wrestlers at the 1980 Summer Olympics
People from Teplice nad Bečvou
Sportspeople from the Olomouc Region